Two ships of the Royal Navy have borne the name HMS Geranium, after the flower, the geranium:

  was an  sloop launched in 1915.  She was transferred to the Royal Australian Navy in 1920, was dismantled in 1932 and sunk as a target in 1935.
  was a  launched in 1940 and sold to the Royal Danish Navy in 1945.  They renamed her Thetis and discarded her in 1963.

Royal Navy ship names